Panther Creek may refer to:

Streams

Florida
 Panther Creek (Florida), a tributary of East Bay River, near Navarre, Florida

Idaho
 Panther Creek (Idaho), a tributary of the Salmon River (Idaho)

Illinois
 Panther Creek (Mackinaw River), a tributary of the Mackinaw River
 Panther Creek (North Fork Embarras River), a tributary of the North Fork Embarras River
 Jim Edgar Panther Creek State Fish and Wildlife Area, in Cass County

Iowa
 Panther Creek (Iowa), a tributary of the Raccoon River

Missouri
 Panther Creek (Blackwater River)
 Panther Creek (Brush Creek tributary)
 Panther Creek (Caldwell County)
 Panther Creek (Cape Girardeau County)
 Panther Creek (East Fork Grand River)
 Panther Creek (James River)
 Panther Creek (Osage Fork Gasconade River)
 Panther Creek (Osage River)
 Panther Creek (Polk County)

New York
 Panther Creek (Schoharie Creek tributary)

Pennsylvania
 Panther Creek (Little Schuylkill River), a tributary of the Little Schuylkill River
 Panther Creek Valley
 Panther Creek (Spring Brook), a tributary of Spring Brook in Spring Brook Township, Lackawanna County

Washington
 Panther Creek (Wind River), the river of Panther Creek Falls

West Virginia
 Panther Creek (Tug Fork), a stream in West Virginia

Other
 Panther Creek Township, Cass County, Illinois
 Panther Creek High School (North Carolina), in Cary
 Panther Creek State Park, in Tennessee
 Panther Creek Consolidated Independent School District, in Valera, Texas
 Panther Creek High School (Texas), in the above district
 Panther Creek Wind Farm, in Big Spring, Texas

See also

Panther Branch (disambiguation)
Panther Run